The Pirapetinga River is a river of Rio de Janeiro state in southeastern Brazil. It is a tributary of the Paraíba do Sul.

See also
List of rivers of Rio de Janeiro

References

External links 
Brazilian Ministry of Transport

Rivers of Rio de Janeiro (state)